Sobb Story is the second single from Leaders of the New School's  debut album A Future Without a Past..., where it followed up at #8 at Hop Hip Singles charts. It contains samples from a Hugo Montenegro recording, Aces High.

Music video
The video opens with an introduction where a car engine comes on and the tailpipe starts to sputter. As we originally see the group riding on the front of the car and dancing to the rhythm while they are going to a house party, Leaders of the New School comes in with a smooth-like, mellow flow. Busta Rhymes is the first to spill his lyrical lines about his ups & downs.
Charlie Brown comes in with a second verse right after Busta and begins to flow on. Then Dinco D drops his last verse with a little ad-lib into the song. As the Leaders are performing in front of the people, the music fades and the video ends.

Sobb Story track list

12 inch
A-Side
   Sobb Story (LP Version) (4:51)
   Sobb Story (Trackmasters Remix) (4:21)
   Sobb Story (Instrumental) (3:37)
B-Side
   Sound of the Zeekers @#^**?! (LP Version) (5:16)
   Sound of the Zeekers @#^**?! (Instrumental) (5:16)
   Case of the P.T.A. (Remix) (4:02)

External links
"Sobb Story" music video at YouTube

1991 singles
Leaders of the New School songs
1991 songs
Songs written by Busta Rhymes
Elektra Records singles
Songs written by Eric "Vietnam" Sadler